Boneham is a surname. Notable people with the surname include:

 Peter Boneham (born 1934), American-born Canadian choreographer, dance educator, and artistic director
 Rupert Boneham (born 1964), American mentor for troubled teens

See also
 Bonham (surname)